The Looming Storm is a 2017 Chinese neo-noir suspense film directed and written by Dong Yue. The film was screened at the 30th Tokyo International Film Festival. Duan Yihong won Best Actor Award at the Tokyo International Film Festival and Chinese Film Media Awards 2018.

Plot
The story took place in a small town in the 1990s. Successive murders show that a vicious and cold-blooded serial killer lurks in this rainy city, and that this person is most likely to be local. Insiders in a factory. Yu Guowei (Duan Yihong) is a director of the Factory Security Division. He was called "Yu Shen Tan" because he has repeatedly cracked the theft cases in the factory.
After the murder, Yu Guowei felt that he had the responsibility to contribute to investigating the truth of the case. I don't know that Yu Guowei was just a joke in the eyes of the criminal investigation team leader Zhang Zhang (Du Yuan) and Li police officer (Zheng Chuyi). The presence. Yu Guowei decided to use his own strength to investigate the truth of the case and met a woman named Yan Zi (Jiang Yiyan) in an accident. There is a repressed and subtle relationship between Yu Guowei and the swallow.

Cast
 Duan Yihong as Yu Guowei
 Jiang Yiyan as Yanzi
 Du Yuan as Lao Zhang
 Zheng Wei as Xiao Liu
 Zheng Chuyi as Police Officier Li
 Zhang Lin as Song Jun
 Liu Tao as middle age woman
 Chen Gang as truck driver
 Su Yujie as Dongzi
 Zhang Penghao as Secretary
 Li Xianliang as Hu
 Zhou Wei as Da Zou
 Cao Bo as Li Feng
 Zhao Ziyan as Xiao Yong
 Guo Jiulong as Doorman

References

External links
 

2017 films
2017 crime drama films
Chinese crime drama films
Chinese-language films